Same-sex marriage is legal in the Australian Capital Territory, and in the rest of Australia, after the Federal Parliament legalised same-sex marriage in December 2017.

The Australian Capital Territory is unique in being the only state or territory jurisdiction in Australia to have independently legalised same-sex marriage. The High Court of Australia nullified a same-sex marriage law that had been passed by the Australian Capital Territory (ACT) legislature on 19 September 2013. The Abbott Government challenged the law shortly after passage and the High Court voided the legislation on 12 December 2013. The 31 same-sex marriages that had been performed under the ACT legislation were consequently void.

The ACT was the first jurisdiction in Australia to legally recognise same-sex couples in 1994. It was the second to allow joint adoption petitions by same-sex couples in 2003, following Western Australia. It also is the first (and currently, only) jurisdiction to allow Civil unions after its Civil Unions Act passed the Legislative Assembly in 2012. Previously, identical legislation was successfully rejected by the federal Howard Government in 2006. In 2013, the Legislative Assembly voted to legalise same-sex marriage, but this law was struck down by the Australian High Court.

From domestic partnerships to civil unions

Domestic Relationships Act 1994
The first legislation to officially recognise same-sex couples in the ACT was the Domestic Relationships Act 1994.  This provided for distribution of property and finances in the event of a separation, and inheritance in the event of death.

Further legislation in 2003 and 2004
Nine years later, six extra acts came into force, passed by the Stanhope Government to get end discrimination against gay men, lesbians, transgender people, their partners and their children in all ACT laws and statutes. These acts were:

Legislation (Gay, Lesbian and Transgender) Amendment Act 2003
Discrimination Amendment Act 2003
Parentage Act 2004
Sexuality Discrimination Legislation Amendment Act 2004
Human Rights Act 2004

Civil Unions Bill 2006
Initially proposed in March 2006, the Civil Unions Bill 2006 was intended to established civil unions for same-sex or opposite-sex couples, providing equal legal recognition with marriage under territory law. The Australian Capital Territory was the first jurisdiction in Australia to pass such legislation, attracting national attention and sparking a conflict between the ACT and the Commonwealth.

Commonwealth Attorney-General Philip Ruddock said that the draft bill "will not satisfy the Commonwealth", which would intervene unless the bill was changed. The Stanhope Government changed the specified parts of the bill;  however, according to Ruddock, other changes were made that circumvented these changes.

The Civil Unions Bill 2006 passed the Australian Capital Territory Legislative Assembly on 11 May 2006. After the law had come into force on 9 June 2006, Ruddock announced that the Commonwealth would move to overrule it. On 13 June 2006, the Federal Executive Council instructed the Governor-General to disallow the Act. The disallowance of the Civil Unions Act was criticised heavily by opposition parties and civil rights advocates, and on 15 June 2006 a motion was moved in the Australian Senate to overturn it and reinstate the legislation. This motion was defeated 32-30 by the majority Coalition members, despite Gary Humphries voting against his party.

Civil Partnerships Bill 2006
In December 2006, the Australian Capital Territory government indicated that it would proceed with new legislation recognising same sex unions based on the United Kingdom civil partnership laws. ACT Attorney-General Simon Corbell made the territory's position clear, stating "It's still our intention to give the same level of recognition provided for in the Civil Unions Act." A second ACT bill, the Civil Partnerships Bill 2006, replaced the term "civil union" with "civil partnership", but was essentially the same in its effect. It was blocked again in February 2007.

Civil Partnerships Act 2008
In December 2007, following the 2007 election and the newly elected Labor Government, discussions about reintroducing a revised civil partnerships bill began again.  Unlike his predecessor, John Howard, the new Prime Minister, Kevin Rudd, said that he would not override ACT legislation allowing for civil unions because it was a matter for states and territories.

In December 2007, the Civil Partnerships Bill went before the ACT Legislative Assembly, but quickly stalled. In February 2008, Attorney-General Robert McClelland responded to the proposed ACT legislation, saying the Rudd Government would not allow civil unions, and reiterated Labor's preference for a system of state-based relationship registers, similar to Tasmania's model. McClelland said that "the ceremonial aspects of the ACT model were inappropriate." The federal government was willing to accept state-based relationship registers so long as they did not "mimic marriage" by allowing a ceremony. McClelland's position was criticised by Greens Senator Bob Brown, who said it was the ugly face of Labor conservatism.

In May 2008, after several attempts to amend the scheme, ACT Attorney-General Simon Corbell announced the Territory had abandoned its civil partnerships legislation, eliminated any ceremonial aspects, and settled for a system of relationship registers virtually identical to the ones operating in Tasmania and Victoria. The federal Government had not compromised at any point during negotiations. The legislation passed the ACT Legislative Assembly on 8 May 2008, giving same-sex couples increased access to superannuation, taxation and social security law reforms. While legislative ceremonies were removed from the Bill, an administrative ceremony may be performed by a representative the ACT Register-General. The Civil Partnerships Act 2008 commenced on 19 May 2008.

Civil Partnerships Amendment Act 2009
The Civil Partnerships Amendment Bill 2009 was presented to the ACT Legislative Assembly by the ACT Greens on 26 August 2009, allowing ceremonies to be conducted with civil partnerships, which was the contentious item removed from the previous year's legislation. Labor initially accused the Greens of playing politics by resurrecting the issue, but unanimously backed the bill as a matter of principle as it is Labor Party policy to support civil unions.

The bill was approved by legislators on 11 November after an amendment was inserted banning opposite-sex couples from having a civil partnership ceremony. This made the ACT the first territory in the country to legalise civil partnerships ceremonies for same-sex couples. The federal government threatened to quash the legislation after it was passed, but after discussions, the federal attorney general said the issue had been resolved satisfactorily, with the legislation to require that same-sex couples register their intention to hold a ceremony and opposite-sex couples be barred from entering into a civil partnership ceremony. The ACT Legislative Assembly introduced and passed the amendments when it sat next in Parliament. The Act was subsequently repealed as a result of the Territory's implementation of the Civil Unions Act 2012.

Civil Unions Act 2012
In August 2012, the ACT's Civil Unions Bill passed after legal advice that the federal government had removed its ability to legislate for territorial and state same-sex marriage after it defined marriage as only between man and woman in the Marriage Amendment Act 2004. The Civil Unions Bill granted many of the same rights to same-sex couples as people married under the Marriage Act. The Act was not challenged by the Gillard federal Government. The Act was to have been repealed upon commencement of the Marriage Equality (Same Sex) Act 2013 (ACT), which (had it not been struck down by the High Court) would have legalised same-sex marriage in the Territory. Due to the High Court holding the ACT's same-sex marriage law to be invalid, the Civil Unions Act 2012 remains in force. Since 9 December 2017, no new civil unions can be registered, as same-sex couples became eligible to get married under federal law. On 8 December 2018, the government stated that civil unions performed prior to that date and not yet converted into marriages remain valid.

2013 same-sex marriage bill

On 13 September 2013, the Australian Capital Territory (ACT) Government made the announcement that it would put forward a bill that would legalise same-sex marriage, following a decade-long attempt to legislate in the area. "We’ve been pretty clear on this issue for some time now and there’s overwhelming community support for this," Chief Minister Katy Gallagher said. "We would prefer to see the federal parliament legislate for a nationally consistent scheme, but in the absence of this we will act for the people of the ACT." The Marriage Equality Bill 2013 enabled couples who were not able to marry under the Commonwealth Marriage Act 1961 to enter into a marriage in the ACT. It provided for solemnisation, eligibility, dissolution and annulment, as well as regulatory requirements and notice of intentions in relation to same-sex marriages. The bill was debated in the ACT Legislative Assembly on 22 October 2013, and passed by 9 votes to 8.

Under the legislation, same-sex marriages were allowed to be performed in the ACT from 7 December 2013. Couples were required to give a minimum one month's notice of intention to marry and 47 couples were eligible to marry in the period between 7 and 12 December, when the High Court struck down the law. In total, 31 same-sex couples elected to marry in the 5-day period between the law's implementation and its subsequent annulment by the High Court.

Challenge in the High Court

On 10 October 2013, George Brandis, the federal Attorney-General for Australia, confirmed that the Commonwealth Government would challenge the ACT bill, stating that the Abbott Government had significant constitutional concerns with respect to the ACT bill.

The full court of the High Court of Australia heard the Commonwealth Government's challenge to the ACT marriage laws on 3 December, less than one week prior to the legislation going into effect. On 13 November, the Commonwealth submitted to the court its written submission, which contained arguments in support of the supposed constitutional and legal invalidity of the ACT's law, stating that the law is "inconsistent" with the provisions of the Self Government Act 1988 (ACT) and the federal Marriage Act. The Solicitor-General of the Commonwealth submitted to the High Court that:

The ACT provided its submission to the Court on 25 November, arguing in response to the Commonwealth that "neither the Marriage Act 1961 (Cth.) nor the Family Law Act 1975 (Cth.) manifest an intention to be an exhaustive or exclusive statement of the [Australian] law governing the institution of marriage". The Commonwealth filed submissions in reply.

High Court ruling

The High Court issued its ruling on 12 December 2013, striking down the ACT's law as inconsistent with the federal Marriage Act and proclaiming that the Constitution permitted only the federal parliament to make laws with respect to marriage in Australia.

In its judgment which struck down the ACT's marriage law, the Court held that:

The Court went further to clarify the extent of the inconsistency of the ACT law with the federal law by stating that:

Passage of Marriage Amendment (Definition and Religious Freedoms) Act 2017
The Federal Parliament legalised same-sex marriage nationwide in December 2017. The new law came into effect in the ACT, and throughout the nation, on 9 December 2017. After the signing of the Marriage Amendment (Definition and Religious Freedoms) Act 2017, the ACT offered free marriage certificates for couples who married there under the 2013 law and wanted to reaffirm their vows, and for couples registered in a civil union.

See also 

 Same-sex marriage in Australia
 LGBT rights in the Australian Capital Territory
 LGBT rights in Australia

Notes

References

External links 
 How to enter into a Civil Partnership at ACT Registry of Births, Deaths and Marriages

2013 in LGBT history
Australian Capital Territory law
Same-sex marriage in Australia